Rio Grande is a 1949 American western film directed by Norman Sheldon and starring Sunset Carson, Lee Morgan and Bobby Clack. It was distributed by the low-budget company Astor Pictures. It was shot on location in San Ygnacio, Texas and at the Oliver Drake Ranch in California.

Cast
 Sunset Carson as Sunset Carson
 Evohn Keyes as Jane Lanning
 Lee Morgan as 	Wes Caven
 Bobby Clack as Bruce Lanning 
 Bobby Deats as 	Sam Elwood 
 Henry Garcia as The Sheriff
 Walter Calmback Jr. as Frank Elwood
 Maria Louisa Marulanda as 	Singing / Dancing Girl

References

Bibliography
 Hardy, Phil. The Western. 
  Pitts, Michael R. Astor Pictures: A Filmography and History of the Reissue King, 1933-1965. McFarland, 2019. W. Morrow, 1983.

External links
 

1949 films
1949 Western (genre) films
American Western (genre) films
American black-and-white films
Astor Pictures films
1940s English-language films
1940s American films